Luis Alberto Monzón León (born 26 May 1970 in Asunción) is a retired football midfielder from Paraguay.

Club career
Monzón started his career in the youth divisions of Olimpia and made his professional debut at the age of 16. He was a key player in the Olimpia team that won the Copa Libertadores in 1990, and throughout his years with the club, he won several national and international championships, which made him one of the squad's most emblematic players. He also played in Mexico for Cruz Azul, in Argentina for Club Atlético Huracán and a few Paraguayan teams before retiring.

International career
Monzón made his international debut for the Paraguay national football team on 27 February 1991 in a friendly match against Brazil (1-1). He obtained a total number of 17 international caps, scoring four goals for the national side. Monzón also played for the Paraguay national football team in the Copa America tournaments of 1991 and 1993.

Honours

Club
 Olimpia
 Paraguayan Primera División: 1995, 1997, 1998, 1999, 2000
 Copa Libertadores: 1990
 Supercopa Sudamericana: 1990
 Recopa Sudamericana: 1990
 Jawaharlal Nehru Centenary Club Cup: 1990
 12 de Octubre
 Paraguayan Primera División: Torneo Clausura 2002

References

External links
 
 

1970 births
Living people
Paraguayan footballers
Paraguayan expatriate footballers
Paraguay international footballers
Paraguayan Primera División players
Liga MX players
Club Olimpia footballers
Cruz Azul footballers
Club Atlético Huracán footballers
Club Nacional de Football players
Club Nacional footballers
12 de Octubre Football Club players
Expatriate footballers in Argentina
Expatriate footballers in Mexico
Expatriate footballers in Uruguay
1991 Copa América players
1993 Copa América players
Club Olimpia managers
Sportspeople from Asunción
Association football midfielders
Paraguayan football managers